The Heathens were an Americana, indie rock band hailing from the Orlando, Florida area. Their first album, Big White House, was released by Post*Records in 2006.

History 
The band formed at Austin Coffee & Film in Winter Park, Florida in early 2005. They earned an opening slot for Hank Williams III as part of the Anti-POP Music Festival at the Social in Orlando. Building momentum on the success and release of their first music video for the song "Stickin' Around," the video was accepted at the Los Angeles Film Fest in May 2006, where it played alongside the likes of other such notable artists as Beck, Yeah Yeah Yeahs, The White Stripes, Nine Inch Nails, Death Cab for Cutie, The Go! Team, The Shins, and Bright Eyes. At the Florida Music Festival of 2006, the video for "Stickin' Around" won the Audience Choice Award for Best Selection. After signing onto Central Florida based Post*Records in 2005, the band released their debut release on July 4, 2006, entitled Big White House, recorded in Gainesville, Florida by Rob McGregor (producer for Alkaline Trio, Rumbleseat, Against Me!, and Hot Water Music).
The Heathens played their last show in the Backbooth on 06.16.2007 at the Stone Soup Festival.

Discography 
Big White House (2006)
Post*Records & Friends Present: Ole! (compilation) (2006)

References

External links 

Stickin' Around music video Directed by Benjamin M. Piety
Music video "Stickin' Around" plays at the LA Film Fest
Heathens CD gets 4 of 5 stars from The Orlando Weekly
KillerPOP CD Review
KillerPOP CD Release
Sugar and Shadows by Jason Ferguson The Orlando Weekly article
Heathens Don't Worship at the Altar of Schlock Pop The Orlando Sentinel article
Fresh New Bands: The Heathens FatAmp Music.com Interview
The Heathens Preach Orlando Music Gospel The Orlando Weekly article
An Interview With Chris Rae of the Heathens
Gentle Tuesday Select CD Volume 2 (Japan)
The Heathens at Breakthru Radio.com
NY based Coolfer talks about the Heathens
Coolfer's take on the Heathen's performance at the 06 FMF
NPR Heathens Interview
MSNBC "Who you are Listening to"

American alternative country groups
Indie rock musical groups from Florida
Musical groups established in 2005
Musical groups disestablished in 2007
Musical groups from Orlando, Florida